This article lists the squads for the 2020 Cyprus Women's Cup, the 13th edition of the Cyprus Women's Cup. The cup consisted of a series of friendly games, and was held in Cyprus from 5 to 11 March 2020. The five national teams involved in the tournament registered a squad of 23 players.

The age listed for each player is on 5 March 2020, the first day of the tournament. The numbers of caps and goals listed for each player do not include any matches played after the start of tournament. The club listed is the club for which the player last played a competitive match prior to the tournament. The nationality for each club reflects the national association (not the league) to which the club is affiliated. A flag is included for coaches that are of a different nationality than their own national team.

Squads

Croatia
Coach: Mate Prskalo

The squad was announced on 2 March 2020.

Czech Republic
Coach: Karel Rada

The squad was announced on 20 February 2020. On 28 February 2020, third goalkeeper Ivana Pižlová and forward Gabriela Šlajsová were added to the squad, while Andrea Jarchovská, Irena Martínková, and Markéta Ringelová were replaced by Markéta Klímová, Eliška Janíková, and Denisa Veselá for health reasons.

Finland
Coach:  Anna Signeul

The squad was announced on 25 February 2020. Nea Lehtola replaced Olga Ahtinen on 29 February 2020. On 5 March 2020, Tuija Hyyrynen was withdrawn from the squad due to injury and replaced with Jutta Rantala. On 7 March 2020, Adelina Engman withdrew from the squad due to injury, returning to London to rehabilitate.

Mexico
Coach: Christopher Cuéllar

The squad was announced on 27 February 2020.

Slovakia
Coach: Peter Kopún

The squad was announced on 3 March 2020. Milan-based Mária Korenčiová withdrew from the squad due to coronavirus fears and was replaced by Tamara Solárová.

Player representation

By club
Clubs with 3 or more players represented are listed.

By club nationality

By club federation

By representatives of domestic league

References

2020